Golf at the 2020 Summer Olympics in Tokyo, Japan featured two events, individual competitions for men and women.

Golf returned to the Olympics in 2016, for the first time since 1904. The 2020 qualification system and format of the events were the same as used in 2016. 60 players qualified for each event, which consisted of a 72-hole individual stroke play tournament, played over four days. The men's event was played first, starting on 29 July, with the women's event starting on 4 August. Due to the COVID-19 pandemic, this was played behind closed doors.

Venue
The tournaments were played on the East course at Kasumigaseki Country Club.

Qualification

Qualification was based on the world rankings as of 21 June 2021 (men) and 28 June 2021 (women), with a total of 60 players qualifying in each of the men's and women's events. The top 15 players of each gender qualified, with a limit of four golfers per country that could qualify this way. The remaining spots went to the highest-ranked players from countries that did not already have two golfers qualified. The IGF guaranteed that at least one golfer from the host nation and each geographical region (Africa, the Americas, Asia, Europe, and Oceania) would qualify. The IGF posted weekly lists of qualifiers based on the current rankings for men and women.

Competition schedule

Participating nations

The list shows the number of participating athletes from each nation.

Events

Medal summary

Medalists

References

External links
 Results book 

 
2020 Summer Olympics
2020
2020 Summer Olympics events
Olympics